John Brown (Seminole chief) (1842–1919), Seminole Chief and Confederate Army officer
J. F. Brown (1877–1950), Arizona rancher and politician